Bedero Valcuvia is a town and comune located in the province of Varese, in the Lombardy region of northern Italy, in the Valcuvia valley.

Cities and towns in Lombardy